The 2017–18 season is East Bengal FC's 98th season in existence. The club has won the Calcutta Football League this season for the record consecutive 8th time. The Red and Gold Brigade finished 4th in the much-awaited 2017-18 I League campaign, coming ever so close once again. East Bengal reached the final of the inaugural Indian Super Cup being held at Bhubaneshwar but lost to Bengaluru FC by 4-1.

Pre-Season Overview
The club roped in I League winning coach Khalid Jamil as their head coach from Aizawl FC and physio Djair Miranda Garcia from arch-rivals Mohun Bagan who was pivotal to Mohun Bagan's success in recent years.
East Bengal retained their star striker Willis Deon Plaza and brought in I League winning Midfielder Mahmoud Amnah from Aizawl FC. East Bengal also roped in 3 more players from Aizawl FC, wingers Brandon Vanlalremdika, Laldanmawia Ralte and Left Back Lalramchullova.
The Red and Gold Brigade are hoping to seal the Calcutta Football League championship and set an octa-title record of winning it for the 8th consecutive year. 
East Bengal also roped in the star midfielder Katsumi Yusa from their arch-rivals Mohun Bagan who would be playing in the I League after 4 seasons playing for the Green and Maroons.

Team

First-team Squad

{|class="wikitable" style="text-align:center; font-size:90%; width:80%;"
|-
!style="background:#d71a23; color:#ffcd31; text-align:center;"|No.
!style="background:#d71a23; color:#ffcd31; text-align:center;"|Name
!style="background:#d71a23; color:#ffcd31; text-align:center;"|Nationality
!style="background:#d71a23; color:#ffcd31; text-align:center;"|Position
!style="background:#d71a23; color:#ffcd31; text-align:center;"|Date of Birth (Age)
|-
!colspan=5 style="background:#ffcd31; color:#d71a23; text-align:center;"|Goalkeepers
|-
|1
|Ubaid CK 
|
|GK
|
|-
|12
|Luis Barreto 
|
|GK
|
|-
|31
|Dibyendu Sarkar 
|
|GK
|
|-
|32
|Mirshad Michu 
|
|GK
|
|-
!colspan=5 style="background:#d71a23; color:#ffcd31; text-align:center;"|Defenders
|-
|3
|Arnab Mondal (captain)
|
|CB
|
|-
|4
|Lalramchullova
|
|RB/LB
|
|-
|14
|Eduardo Ferreira
|
|CB
|
|-
|16
|Gurwinder Singh
|
|CB
|
|-
|18
|Mehtab Singh
|
|RB
|
|-
|23
|Tanmoy Ghosh
|
|LB
|—
|-
|24
|Salam Ranjan Singh
|
|RB/LB/CB
|
|-
|25
|Samad Ali Mallick
|
|RB
|
|-
|29
|Deepak Kumar
|
|LB
|
|-
|37
|Rahul Ghosh
|
|LB
|
|-
!colspan=5 style="background:#ffcd31; color:#d71a23; text-align:center;"|Midfielders
|-
|5
|Khalid Aucho
|
|CDM
|
|-
|6
|Mahmoud Amnah
|
|CM/AM
|
|-
|7
|Cavin Lobo (vice-captain)
|
|CM/AM
|
|-
|8
|Mohammed Rafique
|
|CM
|
|-
|10
|Katsumi Yusa
|
|AM/LW/RW
|
|-
|11
|Gabriel Fernandes 
|
|RW/AM
|
|-
|17
|Laldanmawia Ralte 
|
|RW
|
|-
|21
|Surabuddin Mollick 
|
|RW
|
|-
|27
|Nikhil Poojari 
|
|RW
|
|-
|30
|Brandon Vanlalremdika 
|
|LW
|
|-
|35
|Yami Longvah 
|
|LW
|
|-
|38
|Prakash Sarkar
|
|CDM/RB
|
|-
|40
|Ansumana Kromah
|
|CAM
|
|-
!colspan=5 style="background:#d71a23; color:#ffcd31; text-align:center;"|Forwards
|-
|44
|Dudu Omagbemi 
|
|FW
|
|-
|19
|V P Suhair 
|
|FW
|
|-
|22
|Jobi Justin
|
|FW
|
|-

Technical staff

Transfers

Players Retained

Transfers IN

Loaned Out

Released

Season Overview

August
The 7 times defending champions started the Calcutta Football League campaign in style as they defeated the newly promoted side Rainbow FC 4–1 with V P Suhair scoring a hat-trick on his debut, thus becoming the 4th East Bengal player after Ashim Moulick (1963), Shyam Thapa (1966) and Bikash Narzinary (2010)  to score a hat-trick on debut. Surabuddin Mollick scored the second hat-trick of the season for East Bengal as he came in from the bench to net 3 against Peerless FC in the second half.

September
East Bengal drew 2–2 against Mohammedan Sporting at Kalyani Stadium in the Mini Derby. Willis Plaza scored the third hat-trick for the season for East Bengal when he took on Tollygunge Agragami just before the big Derby. Maintaining their undefeated streak, East Bengal went on to win the league to win the Calcutta Football League for a record consecutive 8 times, bettering their own record of 1970–75. Mohun Bagan drew 2–2 in the derby which helped East Bengal secure their 8th consecutive league win via Goal Difference as both teams were on 23 points from 9 games.  East Bengal was crowned champions for a record 39th time.

October
Following the win in the Calcutta Football League, East Bengal decided to play few Pre Season Friendlies against ISL teams. East Bengal would play against Bengaluru FC, FC Pune City, FC Goa and Jamshedpur FC.

East Bengal also roped in defensive midfielder Armand Bazzie from Rainbow FC after impressing coach Khalid Jamil in trails. Carlyle Mitchell had to be released as he sustained an injury which would keep him out of action for the rest of the season. Former Mohun Bagan defender Eduardo Ferreira was brought in as the replacement.

November
East Bengal drew 1–1 against Bengaluru FC in the first preseason game while lost 3–1 in the second match against the same opponents. FC Pune City won the 3rd preseason game by a close margin 2–1. East Bengal came back in style as they won the next two preseason games, 2–1 against FC Goa and 3–1 against Jamshedpur FC. Armand Bazzie gained a lot of praise in the preseason games, while Mahmoud Amnah and Katsumi Yusa formed a formidable pair which is providing hopes for Red and Gold fans for the upcoming I League, which East Bengal has not won since 2004. 
East Bengal started off the I League campaign with a 2–2 draw against the defending champions Aizawl FC. East Bengal squandered a 2-goal lead scored by Eduardo Ferreira and Katsumi Yusa to get equalized in the dying seconds of the match. Next up they face their arch-rivals in the first I League Kolkata Derby of the season, when they face Mohun Bagan on 3 December at the Salt Lake Stadium.

December
East Bengal lost the first I League Kolkata Derby of the season by a 1–0 margin after Mohun Bagan defender Eze Kingsley scored the solitary goal in the 39th minute from a Sony Norde corner. East Bengal fought hard in the second half but could not break the Mohun Bagan defence. This is one of the worst starts to East Bengal's I League campaign in recent years.
East Bengal faced Shillong Lajong FC at Barasat Stadium on 9 December next. East Bengal thumped Shillong Lajong to a 5–1 victory with a brace from ex Aizawl FC man Laldanmawia Ralte and one each Mahmoud Amnah, Eduardo Ferreira and Katsumi Yusa. Lajong captain Samuel Lalmuanpuia scored the consolation goal for them.
East Bengal faced Churchill Brothers at Barasat Stadium on 16 December next where in a crunch game East Bengal snatched the 3 points in the dying minute of the game when Willis Plaza scored a header from a Katsumi Yusa corner to make it 3–2 for East Bengal. Plaza netted a brace while assisted one for Laldanmawia Ralte who scored his 3rd goal for the campaign.
East Bengal faced Chennai City FC on 22 December away at Coimbatore next where in tough conditions East Bengal managed to win their first away game of the season by a margin of 2–1. Katsumi Yusa opened the scoring while Charles put in the second for them. East Bengal now sit at the second spot in the league with 10 points from 5 games.
East Bengal faced Gokulam Kerala FC at Salt Lake Stadium on 27 December next and in a disarrayed game in a chilly Kolkata winter evening, East Bengal managed a 1–0 win courtesy of a Mohammed Rafique screamer from 25 yards out in the 44th minute. East Bengal managed to grab hold of the lead which earned them important 3 points and took them to the top of the table via goal difference to Minerva Punjab FC who lost earlier the same day.
East Bengal faced NEROCA FC away at Imphal on 30 December next where in tough away conditions East Bengal managed to get a point after conceding a late equalizer in the 89th minute. Katsumi Yusa put East Bengal ahead in the 12rh minute, however Willis Plaza pulled his hamstring in the 40th minute which made East Bengal to play defensive and hence conceded the late equalizer. East Bengal end the calendar year 2017 on Top of the League Table.

January
East Bengal faced Indian Arrows away at Delhi on 2 January next and fielded a squad without start man Willis Plaza who carried an injury from the last game against NEROCA FC. Young Jobi Justin started in place of Willis Plaza. East Bengal managed to get an early lead when Mahmoud Amnah scored from a free kick in the 13th minute. Katsumi Yusa doubled the lead in the 16th minute after receiving a ball from Amnah from the right. East Bengal managed to hold onto a 2–0 lead and came out with important 3 points from a tough away game. East Bengal now sit on top of the league table with 17 points from 8 games.
East Bengal faced Churchill Brothers away at Tilak Maidan in Goa on 8 January next and dropped 2 valuable points after drawing 1–1 against the bottom-placed side in the league table. East Bengal went ahead with a terrific header by young Jobi Justin from a Laldanmawia Ralte cross from the right. East Bengal were leading the proceedings in the match when suddenly from a counter-attack Churchill's new signing Mechac Koffi scored a blinder from outside the box. East Bengal now has 18 points from 9 games with 9 more games to go.
East Bengal released their foreign import Charles after a series of poor performances by the Brazilian. He was replaced by Dudu Omagbemi who joined for his second stint for the Red and Golds after 2014–15 Season where he scored 20 goals for East Bengal in all competitions. 
East Bengal faced Aizawl FC away at Rajiv Gandhi Stadium in Aizawl on 16 January next wherein tough altitude conditions East Bengal managed a goalless draw against the defending champions. A lack-luster display from the Red and Golds along with poor attacking cost East Bengal vital 2 points before the return Kolkata Derby of the I League, which also meant East Bengal now trail by 6 points to League leaders Minerva Punjab FC with 8 more matches to go.
East Bengal faced Mohun Bagan for the second Kolkata Derby of the I League on 21 January at the Salt Lake Stadium next and lost by a 2–0 margin with Dipanda Dicka netting a brace. Dicka scored in the first minute after Akram Moghrabi headed down a cross from the right. Dicka scored the second of the day when he acrobatically volleyed the ball into the net from a corner in the 35th minute. Mohun Bagan could have scored more if not their forwards missed sitters. East Bengal now seems out of the title race and currently sits 3rd in the league table with 19 points from 11 matches. 
East Bengal released their foreign import Willis Plaza after a series of poor performances and lack of goals from the star forward who was also carrying a thigh injury along. East Bengal roped in Liberian Ansumana Kromah who was released by Mohun Bagan earlier in the transfer window. The former Green and Maroon attacking midfielder will boost the Red and Gold attacking set up. 
East Bengal faced Minerva Punjab F.C. on 30 January at the Barasat Stadium next where in a crunch game East Bengal managed a 2–2 draw, coming back from 0–2 at HT. Minerva Punjab F.C. went ahead in the 20th minute when Sukhdev Singh scored from a rebound. Minerva Punjab F.C. extended their lead in the 33rd minute when their star Bhutanese man Chencho Gyeltshen scored dribbling past two defenders. After Half Time, East Bengal came out with renewed vigour and rallied back into the game with goals from Jobi Justin in the 59th minute from a Katsumi Yusa corner and Brandon Vanlalremdika in the 88th minute. East Bengal could have come out with all 3 points if not their star Japanese man Katsumi Yusa missed from the spot early in the second half. East Bengal now sits at 3rd spot in the League Table with 20 points from 12 games with 6 more matches to go.

February
East Bengal released another of their foreign import Armand Bazie for his poor performances throughout the League campaign. Bazie is the third foreign player after Charles and Willis Plaza that East Bengal has released during the ongoing I League season. 
East Bengal faced Indian Arrows on 4 February at the Barasat Stadium next where after a frustrating performance by the Red and Gold front line, East Bengal managed to score in the dying minute of the match, when Dudu Omagbemi found the net from a glancing header in the 93rd minute, taking a 1–0 lead, ensuring 3 points for the Red and Golds who now sits 3rd in the table with 23 points from 13 games, with 5 more to go. 
East Bengal faced Minerva Punjab F.C. on 13 February at the Tau Devi Lal Stadium in Panchkula next and in a do-or-die game against the league leaders East Bengal managed a 1–0 win with a sublime strike from Cavin Lobo in the 60th minute. East Bengal managed to hold on to the lead and reduced the gap to just 3 points from the league leaders Minerva Punjab F.C. East Bengal now sits at 26 points from 14 games with just 4 more to go. 
East Bengal roped in Uganda national football team Defensive Midfield player Khalid Aucho as a replacement for 'Armand Bazie'. He played for Serbian giants Red Star Belgrade before getting released in July 2017. 
East Bengal faced Gokulam Kerala F.C. on 17 February at the EMS Stadium in Kozhikode next and lost 2–1 to the home side after leading 1–0 at Half-time courtesy of a spot-kick from Katsumi Yusa in the injury time before the break. Gokulam Kerala F.C. came back hard in the second half and rallied to score two goals to snatch back to back wins. This loss has hurt the title ambitions for the Red and Golds, with just 3 matches to go. 
East Bengal faced Chennai City FC on 24 February at the Salt Lake Stadium next and in a do-or-die game, the Red and Gold brigade ran riot against the southerners and clinched an all-important 7–1 win. Mahmoud Amnah opened the scoring in the 20th minute and since then the floodgates were opened. Dharmaraj Ravanan placed the ball into his own net for the second goal when he misjudged the cross from Lalramchullova. Dudu Omagbemi finally rose to the occasion and showed his class and scored in the next 4 goals, thus becoming the fourth East Bengal player to score a hat-trick in the season and first in this I League. Gabriel Fernandes came on in the 80th minute for his first appearance in the I League and in no time put his name in the scoresheet with a sublime strike from outside the box to make it 7–1 for the hosts. Eduardo Ferreira got his 4th booking and will miss the vital away game against Shillong Lajong on 5 March. East Bengal now sits 2nd in the table with just 2 more matches to go.

March
East Bengal faced Shillong Lajong on 5 March at the Jawaharlal Nehru Stadium next and in a must-win game the Red and Gold Brigade again drew 2–2 to seriously hamper their title aspirations. Dudu Omagbemi opened the scoring but Shillong Lajong rallied from behind to take a 2–1 lead. Dudu Omagbemi scored the equalized late to ensure East Bengal have a chance on the last round to get the title if all results go in their favour.
East Bengal faced NEROCA F.C. on 8 March at the Salt Lake Stadium next in the final game of the 2017-18 I-League and in a 4 way title decider final round, the Red and Golds only managed a 1-1 draw with Dudu Omagbemi scoring the equalizer after Felix Chidi put NEROCA F.C. ahead. Minerva Punjab FC won their match 1-0 which meant the team from Punjab won their maiden I-League title. 
East Bengal finished the I-League campaign in the 4th Position, dragging their conquest to the long-awaited title for 15 years now. East Bengal has qualified for the Pre-Quarter-finals of the 2018 Indian Super Cup that is going to start from 31 March at the Kalinga Stadium, Bhubaneshwar. 
East Bengal appointed veteran and club legend Subhash Bhowmick as the Technical director to assist Khalid Jamil. This is the fourth stint for Subhash Bhowmick popularly known as Bhombol Da at East Bengal and this one after 9 long years after he resigned as the Coach of the East Bengal club after the infamous 5-3 Kolkata Derby on 25 October 2009.

April
East Bengal faced Mumbai City F.C. on 5 April 2018 at the Kalinga Stadium, Bhubaneshwar in the Pre Quarter-finals of the 2018 Indian Super Cup. The ISL side took the lead early in the first half from a sublime free kick from their foreign import Achille Emaná in the 22nd minute of the game. The Red and Gold brigade bounced back and equalized within 4 minutes when star man Katsumi Yusa headed in an inch-perfect cross by Laldanmawia Ralte from the right. East Bengal rallied back in the second half when Mahmoud Amnah scored the winner in the 73rd minute with a perfect volley to win it 2-1. 
East Bengal faced Aizawl F.C. on 8 April 2018 at the Kalinga Stadium, Bhubaneshwar in the Quarter-finals of the 2018 Indian Super Cup and in adverse hot and humid conditions, the Red and Gold brigade managed to snatch a 1-0 win against the Highlanders with an injury-time spot kick by ex Aizawl F.C. man Laldanmawia Ralte himself in the 95th minute to put East Bengal through to the Semi-finals of the inaugural Indian Super Cup.
East Bengal faced FC Goa on 16 April 2018 at the Kalinga Stadium, Bhubaneshwar in the Semi-final of the 2018 Indian Super Cup. FC Goa missed the likes of Hugo Boumous and Pronay Halder who are carrying double Yellow Card and also Bruno Pinheiro, Brandon Fernandes and Sergio Juste Marin who were Sent Off in the Quarter-final match against Jamshedpur FC. In the crunch game amidst adverse hot and humid conditions the Red and Gold brigade snatched a hard-fought 1-0 win against the ISL side with the solitary goal coming at the 78th minute of the game when Katsumi Yusa put in a cross from the left which was tapped in by Dudu Omagbemi to break the deadlock. FC Goa was soon put down to 10 men as their star midfield man Edu Bedia was given marching orders after a double booking in the 82nd minute. East Bengal managed to hold onto the lead and reached the inaugural Indian Super Cup Final. 
East Bengal faced Bengaluru FC on 20 April 2018 at the Kalinga Stadium, Bhubaneshwar in the final of the inaugural 2018 Indian Super Cup. Bengaluru FC has defeated Mohun Bagan 4-2 in the other Semi-final and lost by 4-1. Ansumana Kromah took the lead for East Bengal in the 28th minute with an acrobatic attempt. Rahul Bheke equalised for Bengaluru FC in the 39th minute, heading in from a corner. Samad Ali Mallick was given marching orders after he elbowed an opponent which was the turning point of the game. Sunil Chhetri scored a brace while Miku scored another as Bengaluru FC won 4-1 and lifted the inaugural Indian Super Cup.

Kit
Supplier: PERF / Sponsors: Kingfisher Premium / Co-Sponsor: Shyam Steel

Competitions

Overall

Overview

Calcutta Football League

Standings

Note: 1=These teams got walkover against Southern Samity and they got 3 point each.

I-League

Table

Result summary

Results by round

Super Cup

Brackets

Pre Quarter-finals

Quarter-finals

Semi-finals

Final

Matches

Calcutta Football League

Fixtures & results

Pre Season Friendlies

Fixtures & results

I League

Fixtures & results

Indian Super Cup

Fixture & results

Statistics

Appearances

Players with no appearances not included in the list.

[B] Played for Mohun Bagan in the 2017–18 CFL and 2017-18 I-League. Made 9 Appearances in 2017–18 CFL and 11 appreances in 2017-18 I-League for Mohun Bagan.

Goal Scorers

a Denotes Players who left East Bengal mid season.

Hat-tricks

4 Scored 4 goals in the match

Clean Sheets

Correct as of matches played on 20 April 2018

Disciplinary Record

Honours

Titles Won
2017-18 Calcutta Premier Division Champions (39th time Champions)
*8th consecutive Calcutta League title for East Bengal (2010–2017)

See also
 2017–18 in Indian football
 2017–18 Calcutta Premier Division
 2017-18 I-League
 2018 Indian Super Cup

References

East Bengal Club seasons
2017–18 I-League by team